Shekarlui-ye Olya (also Romanized as Shekarlūī-ye ‘Olyā; also known as Shekarlū-ye Bālā, Shekarlū-ye ’Olyā, and Shokorlū-ye ‘Olyā) is a village in Ojarud-e Shomali Rural District, in the Central District of Germi County, Ardabil Province, Iran. At the 2006 census, its population was 70, in 14 families.

References 

Towns and villages in Germi County